7/5 may refer to:
July 5 (month-day date notation)
May 7 (day-month date notation)